Merkley+Partners is a full-service advertising agency located in New York City.  It is a wholly owned subsidiary of Omnicom Group, and a member of DAS. Currently the agency has 225 employees.

The agency is currently managed by Chief Executive Officer Alex Gellert and Executive Creative Director / Chairman Andy Hirsch.  They joined the agency in 1999. Scott Gelber was named President in 2018.

The agency, originally named Merkley Newman Harty, was founded in 1993 by Parry Merkley, Creative Director, Steve Harty, Client Services Director, and Jane Newman, Strategic Planning Director.  The three founders came together with the intent of removing the boundaries between their respective disciplines.

Clients
Clients include Mercedes-Benz, the Ad Council, LendingTree, Teva Pharmaceuticals, Sun Products, Smart Car, RushCard, the Ferrero Company, including brands TicTac and Nutella, Florida's Natural and Vanda Pharmaceuticals.

Recent awards
 Bronze Clio for Mercedes-Benz, 2013
 Nielsen Luxury Campaign of the Year for Mercedes-Benz, 2013
 Outstanding Website for ProAir HFA, 2013. 
 Silver New York ADDY for Mercedes-Benz, 2012
 Silver at the IAAA Awards for Mercedes-Benz, 2012
 Silver and Bronze at the IAAA Awards for Smart, 2012
 Silver ADDY for best public service campaign, Gold New York ADDY, Silver New York ADDY District Silver ADDY, and Communication Arts Award for the Ad Council Campaign Lead Poisoning Prevention, 2011

References

External links

Advertising agencies of the United States
Marketing companies established in 1993